Ugia albooculata is a species of moth in the  family Erebidae. The species is found in northern Madagascar.

This species has a wingspan of 39 mm.

References

Ugia
Moths of Madagascar
Moths described in 1880
Moths of Africa